Inventors Digest is a monthly magazine and web site devoted to promoting the interests of independent and professional inventors.  It was founded in 1985 as an eight-page newsletter. The magazine is the US nation's longest-running monthly magazine for inventor-entrepreneurs, and it explores the intersection of innovation and business.  The magazine is part of Enventys, a product development company, which was founded by Louis Foreman. The company acquired the magazine in 2007. Its headquarters is in Charlotte, North Carolina.

References

External links
 Official website

Business magazines published in the United States
Monthly magazines published in the United States
Magazines established in 1985
Magazines published in North Carolina
Mass media in Charlotte, North Carolina
Newsletters
1985 establishments in North Carolina